is a private university in Komaki, Aichi, Japan. The predecessor of the school was founded in 1967, and it was opened as a university in 2003.

External links
 Official website 

1967 establishments in Japan
Educational institutions established in 1967
Private universities and colleges in Japan
Universities and colleges in Aichi Prefecture
Komaki